The US Post Office–South Norwalk Main, also known as Norwalk Main Post Office, is located at 16 Washington Street in Norwalk, Connecticut.  It is a single story steel and concrete structure, faced in limestone.  It was designed in 1936 and built in 1937, and is an example of what has been termed "starved classicism".  Its lobby areas are decorated by murals by Kindred McLeary, commissioned by the Treasury Department's Section of Painting and Sculpture.

The building was listed on the National Register of Historic Places in 1986.

See also 
National Register of Historic Places listings in Fairfield County, Connecticut
List of United States post offices

References 

Neoclassical architecture in Connecticut
Government buildings completed in 1936
South Norwalk
Buildings and structures in Norwalk, Connecticut
National Register of Historic Places in Fairfield County, Connecticut